Annie Bentoiu (1 May 1927 – 21 December 2015) was a Romanian-born Swiss writer and translator.

The daughter of Constantin Deculescu, a Romanian doctor and politician, and Violette Bujord, a native of Switzerland, she was born Annie Deculescu in Bucharest and grew up there and in Oltenița.

In 1949, she married composer Pascal Bentoiu.

She translated Romanian literature into French. She was awarded the Prix de l'Union des Écrivains for her translations in 1979, 1983 and 1991. In 2000, she was awarded a medal by the President of Romania for her work in translating the works of Mihai Eminescu.

Selected works 
 Strada Mare novel (in Romanian) (1969) as Adriana Vlad
 Poèmes I/II poetry (in French) (1989)
 Dix méditations sur une rose poetry (in French) (1989)
 Phrases pour la vie quotidienne poetry (in French) (1990)
 Timpul ce ni s-a dat volume 1 memoir (in Romanian) (2000)
 Timpul ce ni s-a dat volume 2 memoir (in Romanian) (2006)
 Voyage en Moldavie (in French) (2001)
 Une liberté désenchantée (in French) (2009)

References 

1927 births
2015 deaths
Writers from Bucharest
Romanian emigrants to Switzerland
University of Bucharest alumni
Romanian novelists
Romanian memoirists
Romanian translators
Romanian writers in French
Romanian women writers
Women memoirists
20th-century translators